"Antingone" is a 1966 Australian TV play directed by Patrick Barton. It was made to celebrate the 2,500th anniversary of Greek Theatre.

Plot
Antigone, daughter of Oedipus, is sentenced to death  by Creon, King of Thebes, for defying his orders and burying the body of her dead brother.

Cast
Liza Goddard as Antigone
Raymond Westwell as Creon
Kevin Colebrook as Teiresias
John Derum as Haemon
Joan McArthur as Eurydice
Ann Charleston as Ismene
Kevin Miles as Chorus Leader
Allan Bickford as Chorus Member
Brian Burson as Chorus Member
Edward Howell as Chorus Member
Terry McDermott as Chorus Member
John Godfrey as Chorus Member
Frank Rich as Sentry
Lloyd Cunningham as Messenger

Production
It was filmed in Melbourne. Barton said the role of Antigone "is usually reserved for the stage's established stars. But Liza is quite staggering." He aimed to make the production as realistic as possible and based costumes on photos of peasants in Crete and Greece.

Reception
The Age thought Westwell "did not quite succeed in projecting the intensity of the personal conflict" and the Goddard "seemed over emotional."

References

1966 television plays
1966 Australian television episodes
1960s Australian television plays
Wednesday Theatre (season 2) episodes
Works based on Antigone (Sophocles play)